Justin Pete Hammel (born 2 December 2000) is a Swiss professional footballer who plays as a goalkeeper for Swiss club Grasshopper Club Zürich.

Career
A product of FC Basel's academy, he joined Stade Lausanne-Ouchy in the Swiss Challenge League for the 2020–21 season as third goalkeeper. He quickly rose to the position of being Lausanne-Ouchy's first choice between the posts and was capped 21 times in his first season in the Swiss Challenge League. In the following season, he wrote history to become the only goalkeeper of the Swiss Football League to provide two assists in one game, in a 5:0 home victory over SC Kriens. He played a total 29 matches for Lausanne-Ouchy that season and held nine clean sheets.

On June 15, 2022, he signed for Grasshopper Club Zürich in the Swiss Super League, as second goalkeeper.

International career
Hammel made his debut for the Switzerland U21 team in the 2023 Euro U21 qualifier against Gibraltar U21 and held a clean sheet in the 4:0 victory. He has since played two more games for the Switzerland U21, another 4:0 win against Gibraltar and a 0:1 away victory against Wales, and as such has not yet conceded a goal in international games.

References

External links
 
 SFL Profile

2000 births
Living people
Footballers from Basel
FC Basel players
Swiss men's footballers
Switzerland youth international footballers
Grasshopper Club Zürich players
Swiss Super League players
Swiss Challenge League players
Association football goalkeepers